Greater Poland Province was an administrative division of the Crown of the Kingdom of Poland from 1569 until 1795. The name of the province comes from the historic land of Greater Poland.

The Greater Poland Province consisted initially of twelve voivodeships (after 1768 thirteen voivodeships) and one duchy:
 Brześć Kujawski Voivodeship
 Chełmno Voivodeship
 Gniezno Voivodeship, est. in 1768
 Inowrocław Voivodeship
 Kalisz Voivodeship
 Łęczyca Voivodeship
 Malbork Voivodeship
 Masovian Voivodeship
 Płock Voivodeship
 Pomeranian Voivodeship
 Poznań Voivodeship
 Rawa Voivodeship
 Sieradz Voivodeship
 Prince-Bishopric of Warmia

The location of the Crown Tribunal for the Greater Poland Province (the highest appeal court of the province) was Piotrków Trybunalski, and after the Convocation Sejm (1764) also Poznań and Bydgoszcz.

References 

1795 disestablishments in Poland
Kingdom of Poland
History of Greater Poland
Subdivisions of the Polish–Lithuanian Commonwealth
Political history of Poland